There have been a number of concept cars by the French car manufacturer Citroën, produced to show future ideas and forthcoming models at international motor shows.

References